Ortygornis is a genus of bird in the francolin group of the family Phasianidae.

Taxonomy
The genus Ortygornis was introduced in 1852 by the German naturalist Ludwig Kaiser to accommodate a single species, the grey francolin, which is therefore the type species. The name combines the Ancient Greek ortux meaning "quail" with ornis meaning "bird".

The genus now contains three species, one found in Sub-Saharan Africa and two found South Asia (with one also being found in Iran). The species are:

Of the three species, the crested francolin was formerly placed in its own monotypic genus, Dendroperdix, while the two Asian species were formerly placed in Francolinus. Phylogenetic analyses support these three species grouping together as a distinct clade.

References 

Bird genera
Ortygornis
Taxa named by Ludwig Reichenbach